The Roman Catholic Diocese of Isiro–Niangara is a diocese located in the city of Isiro–Niangara  in the Ecclesiastical province of Kisangani in the Democratic Republic of the Congo.

History
 December 18, 1911: Established as Apostolic Prefecture of Eastern Uélé from the Apostolic Prefecture of Uélé
 May 6, 1924: Promoted as Apostolic Vicariate of Eastern Uélé
 December 14, 1926: Renamed as Apostolic Vicariate of Niangara 
 November 10, 1959: Promoted as Diocese of Niangara
 March 23, 1970: Renamed as Diocese of Isiro – Niangara

Bishops

Ordinaries, in reverse chronological order
 Bishops of Isiro–Niangara (Latin Rite), below
 Bishop Julien Andavo Mbia (since 2003.02.01)
 Bishop Charles Kambale Mbogha, A.A. (1995.12.06 – 2001.03.13), appointed Archbishop of Bukavu
 Bishop Emile Aiti Waro Leru’a (1989.09.25 – 1994.03.24)
 Bishop Ambroise Uma Arakayo Amabe (1976.02.19 – 1989.04.01)
 Bishop François Oddo de Wilde, O.P. (1970.03.23 – 1976.02.19); see below
 Bishop of Niangara (Latin Rite), below
 Bishop François Oddo de Wilde, O.P. (1959.11.10 – 1970.03.23); see above & below
 Vicars Apostolic of Niangara (Roman rite), below
 Bishop François Oddo de Wilde, O.P. (1948.03.11 – 1959.11.10); see above
 Bishop Robert Costanzo Lagae, O.P. (1924.12.18 – 1947)
 Prefects Apostolic of Eastern Uélé (Latin Rite), below
 Fr. Emilio Rolin, O.P. (1922 – 1924)
 Fr. Reginaldo van Schoote, O.P. (1912 – 1922)

Coadjutor bishop
Ambroise Uma Arakayo Amabe (1972-1976)

Other priest of this diocese who became bishop
Dieudonné Madrapile Tanzi, appointed Bishop of Isangi in 2016

See also
Roman Catholicism in the Democratic Republic of the Congo

Sources
 GCatholic.org
 Catholic Hierarchy

Isiro
Roman Catholic dioceses in the Democratic Republic of the Congo
Christian organizations established in 1911
Roman Catholic dioceses and prelatures established in the 20th century
Roman Catholic Ecclesiastical Province of Kisangani